Sibree's dwarf lemur (Cheirogaleus sibreei) is a small nocturnal lemur endemic to Madagascar.

The name of this dwarf lemur commemorates the English missionary and naturalist James Sibree (1836–1929).

In 2010, a research team confirmed that they had found the only known living population of Sibree's dwarf lemurs several years before. The species was long believed extinct, following the destruction of its first recorded forest habitat. This was also the first confirmation of Sibree's dwarf lemur as a unique species.

Sibree's dwarf lemur spends the winter by hibernating  underground in small burrows.

References

Dwarf lemurs
Endemic fauna of Madagascar
Mammals of Madagascar
Critically endangered fauna of Africa
Mammals described in 1896
Taxa named by Charles Immanuel Forsyth Major